Ron Stone (April 6, 1936 – May 13, 2008) was an American news anchor at KPRC-TV in Houston, Texas for 20 years from 1972 to 1992. He was called "the most popular and revered news anchor the city has ever known" by
the Houston Chronicle. He was president of Stonefilms, Inc., a Texas production company.

Education and early career
Stone attended college and received a B.A. from East Central State University. He had an M.L.A. degree from Houston Baptist University. After college, Stone was a broadcaster for the National Football League and the Southwest Conference.

Career

Television news career
Stone was born in Hanna, Oklahoma, graduated from East Central University in Ada, then known as East Central State Teachers College, and worked in radio and television in several small Oklahoma markets. He was working at KVOO-TV (now KJRH-TV) in Tulsa in 1961, when he caught the eye of Dan Rather, who was then KHOU Houston, Channel 11's lead anchor.

Stone started his television news career at Houston CBS affiliate KHOU, where he worked for nearly a decade except for a ten-month period in 1967 where he went to  New York City to work as a news writer and reporter for the NBC Radio Network.  In 1972, Stone moved to NBC affiliate KPRC-TV as anchor for what was known at the time as Big 2 News. During his time at KPRC-TV, he co-anchored the news with Paula Zahn, who later anchored on CNN and who worked with Ron Franklin before his eventual move to ESPN. Stone anchored the weekday editions of the ChannelTwoNews with Jan Carson from 1983 to 1991 and with Linda Lorelle during his final year at KPRC-TV.

Independent producer and other work
After retiring from television news in 1992, he started the production company, Stonefilms, Inc. with his son. In 1979, he succeeded Ray Miller (1919–2008) as host of KPRC-TV's The Eyes of Texas cultural anthology series.  Stone hosted The Eyes of Texas until 1999.

On May 21, 2002, he anchored the news for one evening as a commemorative celebration 
along with veteran meteorologist Doug Johnson (1939 - 1/3/2019) at KPRC-TV.

He lived with renal cell carcinoma and gave motivational speeches about cancer survival.

Stone died of cancer. He was 72.

Scholarly works
Stone wrote three books about Texas history, A Book of Texas Days, 
Disaster at Texas City, and Houston: Simply Spectacular.

He served as Artist in Residence in the Communications Department at the University of St. Thomas in Houston.

Awards
Communicator of the Year, 1990, University of Houston School of Communications
Honorary Doctor of Humane Letters Degree, University of Houston, 1994

Professional membership
Sons of the Republic of Texas
Knight of San Jacinto

See also
Texas City Disaster

References

1936 births
2008 deaths
Television anchors from Houston
American television journalists
People from McIntosh County, Oklahoma
American male journalists
Journalists from Oklahoma
East Central University alumni
Houston Christian University alumni
20th-century American journalists